The 1967 Atlanta Braves season was the Braves' second season in Atlanta and the 97th overall. The team went 77–85, as they suffered their first losing season since 1952, the franchise's final season in Boston. The seventh-place Braves finished 24½ games behind the National League and World Series Champion St. Louis Cardinals.

Offseason 
 November 28, 1966: Ramón Hernández was drafted by the Braves from the California Angels in the 1966 rule 5 draft.
 November 29, 1966: Bill Robinson and Chi-Chi Olivo were traded by the Braves to the New York Yankees for Clete Boyer.
 November 29, 1966: Mike Page was drafted by the Braves from the Boston Red Sox in the 1966 minor league draft.
 December 1966: John Herrnstein and Chris Cannizzaro were traded by the Braves to the Boston Red Sox for Julio Navarro and Ed Rakow.
 December 31, 1966: Eddie Mathews, Arnold Umbach and a player to be named later were traded by the Braves to the Houston Astros for Dave Nicholson and Bob Bruce. The Braves completed the deal by sending Sandy Alomar Sr. to the Astros on February 25, 1967.

Regular season

Season standings

Record vs. opponents

Managerial turnover
The Braves' worst season since —their last year in their original home of Boston—cost manager Billy Hitchcock his job on September 28, 1967; the team stood at 77–82 (.484) and 21 games in arrears of the eventual 1967 World Champion St. Louis Cardinals at the time. Bullpen coach Ken Silvestri took over the club for the final three games of the season (all losses) on an interim basis.

Harris had played with Richards with the minor league Atlanta Crackers in the 1930s, and coached for Richards with three MLB clubs; he had also managed under GM Richards with the 1965 Houston Astros. Harris had been the 1967 skipper of the Triple-A Richmond Braves, and had led them to the best record in the International League.

Notable transactions 
 June 6, 1967: Gene Oliver was traded by the Braves to the Philadelphia Phillies for Bob Uecker.
 June 15, 1967: Wade Blasingame was traded by the Braves to the Houston Astros for Claude Raymond.

Roster

Player stats

Batting

Starters by position 
Note: Pos = Position; G = Games played; AB = At bats; H = Hits; Avg. = Batting average; HR = Home runs; RBI = Runs batted in

Other batters 
Note: G = Games played; AB = At bats; H = Hits; Avg. = Batting average; HR = Home runs; RBI = Runs batted in

Pitching

Starting pitchers 
Note: G = Games pitched; IP = Innings pitched; W = Wins; L = Losses; ERA = Earned run average; SO = Strikeouts

Other pitchers 
Note: G = Games pitched; IP = Innings pitched; W = Wins; L = Losses; ERA = Earned run average; SO = Strikeouts

Relief pitchers 
Note: G = Games pitched; W = Wins; L = Losses; SV = Saves; ERA = Earned run average; SO = Strikeouts

Farm system

Notes

References 

1967 Atlanta Braves season at Baseball Reference

Atlanta Braves seasons
Atlanta Braves season
Atlanta